Operazione Locusta is the code name given to the contribution of the Italian Air Force in the Gulf War.

Description 

Following the invasion and annexation of Kuwait by Iraq, on September 25, 1990 the Italian Government sent eight multirole fighter bombers Tornado IDS (plus two spare) in the Persian gulf, belonging to the 6º, 36º and 50º Stormo, which were deployed at the Al Dhafra Air Base, near Abu Dhabi, in United Arab Emirates.

These planes formed the "Autonomous Flight Department of the Italian Air Force in the Arabian Peninsula". The Department's staff, initially made up of 239 men, including twelve Carabinieri of the Air Force for supervisory needs and military police, was subsequently brought to 314 elements.

The deployment of Italian aircraft was part of the international security system implemented by UN Security Council Resolution 678.

The use of Italian aircraft as part of the Desert Storm operation represented the first operational employment in combat missions of Italian Air Force aircraft after the end of World War II.

During the 42 days of war, Italian fighters made 226 sorties for a total of 589 flight hours.
General Mario Arpino was head of the Air Coordination Unit during the war operations in Saudi Arabia from October 1990 to March 1991.
 
Added to this commitment is the activity carried out by the RF104-G tactical reconnaissance aircraft (for a total of 384 sorties and 515 flight hours) operating in Turkey under the NATO AMF (ACE  Mobile Force  NATO) . This cell had been resettled on the Anatolian peninsula on 6 January 1991, in the face of a decision in NATO, to protect a possible Iraqi attempt to widen the conflict, and the support of transport aircraft, which carried out 244 missions for 4156 hours of flight, ensuring logistical support for national air and naval units as well as the evacuation of nationals from areas at risk.

The RF104-G returned to Italy on March 11, 1991.

The Tornado fighter jets returned to the Gioia del Colle air base on March 15, 1991, two weeks after the end of the military operations. The return of Italian fighter planes to the homeland was welcomed by a ceremony attended by the Minister of Defense Virginio Rognoni, the Chief of the Defense, General Domenico Nardini, and the Chief of Staff of Italian Air Force, General Stelio Nardini.

Loss of an aircraft 
During the conflict, the Italian Air Force recorded the loss of a single aircraft.

On the night between 17 and 18 January 1991, the first military mission of Italian aircraft departed.

Major Gianmarco Bellini (pilot) and captain Maurizio Cocciolone (navigator) took off on board their fighter-bomber along with the other seven Italian aircraft and a formation of allied aircraft for the first mission that saw them employed in the airspace controlled by Iraqi forces.

The squadron's mission was an areal depot (provisioning, ammunition and means) in southern Iraq, northwest of Kuwait City, defended by radar-enslaved anti-aircraft artillery. Bellini and Cocciolone, like many others from the base of the Emirate, were the only ones capable of completing refueling in flight; all other aircraft, including 7 Italian Tornados and about 30 other aircraft from other countries, hindered by weather conditions, failed to approach the aircrew and had to return to base.

Bellini, as head crew, decided that their aircraft would have to go on alone, despite the risk posed by the enemy's defensive deployment. Received the ok by the air tactical command, the aircraft leveled at about 250 feet of altitude, activated the automatic control TF and unhooked the war load (5 Mk 83 bombs) on the target around at 4.30 in the morning.
After about 40 seconds their plane was hit by Iraqi anti-aircraft artillery, trained to defend against low-altitude attacks, and the two Italians had to launch themselves with the ejection seat. The plane hit the ground about 20 km northwest of the Kuwaiti capital, a few hundred meters from an Iraqi Republican Guard barracks.
The two airmen were immediately captured by Iraqi troops, separated, confiscated everything they had with them (including clothing and boots) and forced to wear a yellow suit, which qualified them as prisoners of war.

Major pilot Gianmarco Bellini and Captain Navigator Maurizio Cocciolone were released at the end of the conflict, along with the other prisoners of war captured by the Iraqi forces.

References

Italian Air Force
Gulf War